Petr Martínek (born September 11, 1972) is a Czech former professional ice hockey defenceman. He is currently the head coach of Piráti Chomutov of the Krajske hokejove prebory.

Martínek played 154 games in the Czech Extraliga for HC Litvínov, HC Slavia Praha and HC Znojemští Orli. He also played one season in Norway's UPC-ligaen for Lillehammer IK during the 2004–05 season.

References

External links

1972 births
Living people
Czech ice hockey coaches
Czech ice hockey defencemen
BK Havlíčkův Brod players
HC Kometa Brno players
Lillehammer IK players
HC Litvínov players
HC Most players
Orli Znojmo players
Piráti Chomutov players
HC Slavia Praha players
Sportspeople from Chomutov
HC Tábor players
Czech expatriate ice hockey people
Expatriate ice hockey players in Norway
Czech expatriate sportspeople in Norway
Czechoslovak ice hockey defencemen